Changi City Point (Chinese: 樟城坊) is a shopping mall located in the vicinity of Changi Business Park, Singapore next to Expo MRT station. It was constructed from June 2010 and completed in November 2011.

This mall is renowned for containing factory outlets of various brands such as Adidas, Nike, Lacoste and Pedro. There is also a landscaped themed rooftop garden together with a wet and dry playground on the topmost floor on level 3. Anchor tenants do include Cold Storage, Kopitiam and Challenger.

In 2014, Changi City Point is sold by joint owners, Ascendas Frasers and Ascendas Development, to Frasers Centrepoint Trust (FCT) for $305 million.

See also
 List of shopping malls in Singapore

References

External links
 

Shopping malls in Singapore
Shopping malls established in 2011
2011 establishments in Singapore